John Morgan (June 10, 1735 – October 15, 1789), "founder of Public Medical Instruction in America," was co-founder of the Medical College at the University of Pennsylvania, the first medical school in Colonial America; and he served as the second "Chief physician & director general" of the Continental Army (an early name for the Surgeon General of the United States Army). He was an early member of the American Philosophical Society, elected in 1766, where he served as Curator from 1769-1770.

Biography
The first son of Evan Morgan, an immigrant from Wales, and Joanna Biles, Morgan was born in Philadelphia in the Province of Pennsylvania.  After a classical education at West Nottingham Academy in Maryland, he graduated from the College of Philadelphia (now the University of Pennsylvania) in 1757.

He fought for the British during the Seven Years' War, commissioned as a lieutenant and serving as a surgeon on the western frontier.  After that he studied medicine at the University of Edinburgh, Scotland, where he earned his degree in 1763. He did some touring in Europe, studying medical practice in Paris and visiting Italy.  During this time, he was elected to the Royal Academy of Surgery at Paris in 1764 and the Royal College of Physicians of Edinburgh and of London in 1765.

Medical school

That year with Dr. William Shippen, another Edinburgh graduate, Morgan co-founded the College of Philadelphia Medical School, the first medical school in North America.

Morgan served as Chief Physician to the Continental Army from October 1775 to January 1777. He was empowered by the Continental Congress to inspect regimental hospitals and transfer patients if warranted and to examine regimental surgeons. Rancor with the regimental surgeons became so bad that Morgan quit when the Army moved from Boston to New York.

He was a founding member of the American Philosophical Society in 1766, based in Philadelphia.

Notes

References

External links

Biographical sketch at the University of Pennsylvania

1735 births
1789 deaths
Physicians from Philadelphia
People of colonial Pennsylvania
People of Pennsylvania in the American Revolution
American people of Welsh descent
West Nottingham Academy alumni
University of Pennsylvania alumni
University of Pennsylvania faculty
Alumni of the University of Edinburgh
Physicians in the American Revolution
Surgeons General of the United States Army
Continental Army staff officers
American military personnel of the Seven Years' War
Fellows of the Royal Society
Members of the American Philosophical Society
18th-century American physicians
University and college founders